This list contains the names of albums that contain a hidden track and also information on how to find them. Not all printings of an album contain the same track arrangements, so some copies of a particular album may not have the hidden track(s) listed below. Some of these tracks may be hidden in the pregap, and some hidden simply as a track following the listed tracks. The list is ordered by artist name using the surname where appropriate.

 Frank Zappa, Joe's Garage Act 1 (1979): the spoken-word final minute and a half of the song "Lucille Has Messed My Mind Up" is called "Scrutinizer Postlude." This is unlisted on the LP track listing.
 Zeus: 07 (2007): Track called "Raw" appearing in the pre-gap.
 Rob Zombie, The Sinister Urge (2001): Untitled hidden track that begins at 7:45 of the eleventh track, "House of 1000 Corpses." Consists largely of horror movie dialogue with a short chorus.
 ZZ Top, Eliminator (1983): Some vinyl pressings of this album have looped audio that says “Oh Mercy!” in the inner groove of Side 2.
 ZZ Top, Mescalero (2003): "As Time Goes By"
 Zombina and the Skeletones: Taste The Blood of Zombina and the Skeletones (2002); untitled instrumental track after Horror High School.
 Zebrahead:
Playmate of the Year There are three hidden tracks throughout the album, the first of which is a short demo track titled "Place in France" immediately following the song "Wasted." The second track is another short demo titled "Wookie" which plays right after "The Hell That is My Life." The final track "In My Room" has two hidden tracks, the first of which is a short snippet of Tavis Werts from Reel Big Fish playing the didgeridoo followed by 5 minutes of silence. Afterwards, a prank call to Sony BMG is heard, where lead singer Ali Tabatabaee impersonates then-fellow member Justin Mauriello's mother, who's asking about when her son is going to start making money.
 Ziggy Marley and the Melody Makers, Spirit of Music (1999): untitled song on the same track as "Jah will Be done."
 ZOX, Take Me Home (2003) and The Wait (2005) both contain bonus tracks. These are found by rewinding the CDs as soon as the first song begins.
Zubeen Garg, Sparsh (2000): In the CD Version, Track 9 and Track 10 are untitled hidden track composed by Sagarika and not listed on the back of the album cover.

See also
 List of backmasked messages
 List of albums with tracks hidden in the pregap

References 

Z